FK Velež Mostar are historically one of the most successful clubs in Bosnia and Herzegovina, with two Yugoslav Cup titles (1980–81 and 1985–86), the most in that competition out of any side from Bosnia and Herzegovina. In addition they have also won the 2021–22 edition of the Bosnian Cup. They have come in second place on three occasions, and third place in five instances.

Velež has also qualified for the Europa Conference League two times, while also participating in two former UEFA competitions, the UEFA Cup (four participations, including reaching the quarterfinals in 1974–75) and the Cup Winners' Cup (two participations).

Below is a list of seasons from Velež's debut in the top flight from the 1952–53 season onwards.

Seasons

References

External links
FK Velež Mostar Official website 
FK Velež Mostar at UEFA.com 
FK Velež Mostar at N/FSBiH 

seasons
Sport in Mostar